N'Goussa is a town and commune, coextensive with the district of the same name, in Ouargla Province, Algeria. Some of its inhabitants speak the Ouargli language. As of 2008, the population of the town was 19,039, up from 13,344 in 1998, with an annual population growth rate of 2.2%.

Climate

N'Goussa has a hot desert climate (Köppen climate classification BWh), with very hot summers and mild winters. Rainfall is light and sporadic, and summers are particularly dry.

Education

4.4% of the population has a tertiary education, and another 12.2% has completed secondary education. The overall literacy rate is 73.3%, and is 82.4% among males and 64.1% among females.

Localities
The commune is composed of 14 localities:

N'Goussa
Frane
El Bour
Hassi El Khefif
El Khobna
Oglat Larbaa
Ben Azzouz
Debiche
Hamraya
Ouahda
Chegga
Hassi Maali
El Koum
Hassi Cheta

References

Neighbouring towns and cities

Communes of Ouargla Province
Districts of Ouargla Province